Switzerland will compete at the 2022 European Championships in Munich from 11 to 22 August 2022.

Medallists

Competitors
The following is the list of number of competitors in the Championships:

Athletics

Beach Volleyball

Switzerland has qualified 2 male and 4 female pairs.

Cycling

Road

Men

Women

Mountain bike

Men

Women

Gymnastics

Switzerland has entered 5 men and 5 women.

Men

Qualification

Women

Qualification

Triathlon

Relay

References

2022
Nations at the 2022 European Championships
European Championships